James Templer may refer to:

James Templer (balloon aviator) (1846–1924), early British military pioneer of balloons
James Templer (1722–1782),  self-made magnate and civil engineer
James Templer (canal builder) (1748–1813), Devon landowner and builder of the Stover Canal
James Templer (equestrian) (born 1936), British Olympic equestrian